Pier Giuseppe Gurgo-Salice (1894–1974), generally credited as Pierre Gurgo-Salice, was an Italian film producer. He was a senior figure at Lux Film, an Italian film production company that specialised in co-productions with France where Lux had a subsidiary. His brother  Ermanno Gurgo-Salice headed production in France.

Selected filmography
 Captain Fracasse (1943)
 Sowing the Wind (1944)
 Lunegarde (1946)
 Keep an Eye on Amelia (1949)
 The Paris Waltz (1950)
 Rome-Paris-Rome (1951)
 The Lady of the Camellias (1953)
 Operation Magali (1953)
 Queen Margot (1954)
 Theodora, Slave Empress (1954)
 A Certain Monsieur Jo (1958)
 La bonne tisane (1958)
 Carthage in Flames (1960)
 Les mordus de Paris (1965)
 The Sweet Body of Deborah (1968)

References

Bibliography
 Bermond, Claudio. Riccardo Gualino finanziere e imprenditore: un protagonista dell'economia italiana del Novecento. Centro studi piemontesi, 2005.
 Curti, Roberto. Riccardo Freda: The Life and Works of a Born Filmmaker. McFarland, 2017.
 Gualino, Cesarina. Cesarina Gualino e i suoi amici. Marsilio, 1997.

External links

1894 births
1974 deaths
Italian film producers
People from Casale Monferrato